"Tequila" is a song by English rock band Terrorvision, written by the band and Chuck Rio and produced by Scottish musician Edwyn Collins. The song originally appeared on the band's fourth studio album, Shaving Peaches (1998), and was released as the album's second single on 18 January 1999. For the single release, English music producer Mint Royale remixed the track. These remixes were heavily championed by BBC Radio 1 DJ Zoe Ball, allowing the song to reach number two on the UK Singles Chart, becoming Terrorvision's highest-charting song in the UK. In 1999, the song won the Kerrang! Award for Best Single.

Release
For its release as a single, Mint Royale remixed "Tequila", creating three mixes known as the "Mint Royale shot", "Mint Royale chaser", and "Mint Royale slammer" versions. These versions replace the original instrumentation with more shakers, whistles, and trumpets and adds a children-sung chorus. "Risk Worth Taking" was also included as a B-side on the second UK CD. The song was originally scheduled to be released a week earlier than planned, but the management team of Spice Girl Geri Halliwell convinced the band to delay the release for a week. According to lead vocalist Tony Wright:

Shortly before EMI Records released "Tequila", they discussed dropping Terrorvision from the label. However, the Mint Royale mixes of the song soon earned heavy support from Zoe Ball, who at the time hosted BBC Radio 1's Breakfast show. Public demand eventually led to the single's release on 18 January 1999.

Critical reception
British columnist James Masterton wrote that the original version of the song was not a standout on the album but called the Mint Royale version "the most sublime party track you have heard since, well, Brimful of Asha". At the 1999 Kerrang! Awards, the song won the Award for Best Single. In 2011, Tequila-based website TasteTequila ranked the song at number three on their list of the "13 Obscure (Yet Awesome) Songs About Tequila". Conversely, Caroline Sullivan of The Guardian wrote that the song was a "fluke", going on to say that the only thing that distinguishes the song from anonymity is the refrain, comparing "Tequila" as a whole to a cover version of Five's "Keep On Movin'".

Chart performance
On the week starting 24 January 1999, "Tequila" debuted at number two on the UK Singles Chart, behind the Offspring's "Pretty Fly (for a White Guy)". Regarding this result, Wright said that he did not mind that they did not top the chart, explaining that he was happy there were two rock bands occupying the top two positions. By reaching number two, "Tequila" became Terrorvision's highest-charting single in their home country as well as their longest-charting, staying in the top 100 for 13 weeks, twice as long as their second-longest-charting song, "Oblivion" (1994). In 2013, the single was certified silver by the British Phonographic Industry (BPI) for shipping over 200,000 copies in the UK.

Outside the UK, "Tequila" became Terrorvision's only top-30 hit on the Irish Singles Chart, peaking at number 20 and spending four weeks in the top 30. The song also reached the top 30 in Iceland, where it peaked at number 23 in May 1999. Elsewhere in Europe, the song charted only in the Netherlands, reaching number 83 on the Single Top 100 ranking. On the Eurochart Hot 100, the single debuted and peaked at number 13 on the issue dated 6 February 1999. In New Zealand, "Tequila" became Terrorvision's only song to chart, debuting at its peak of number 13 on 28 March 1999 and spending seven weeks in the top 50. Despite the song's success, Terrorvision would soon be dropped by EMI Records.

Track listings
UK CD1 and 12-inch single
 "Tequila" (Mint Royale chaser)
 "Tequila" (album version)
 "Tequila" (Mint Royale slammer)

UK CD2
 "Tequila" (Mint Royale shot)
 "Tequila" (album version)
 "Risk Worth Taking"

European CD single
 "Tequila" (Mint Royale shot)
 "Tequila" (album version)

Personnel
Personnel are lifted from the Shaving Peaches album booklet and the UK CD1 liner notes.

 Terrorvision – writing
 Tony Wright – lead vocals, backing vocals
 Mark Yates – electric guitar, Spanish guitar
 Leigh Marklew – bass
 Ian "Shutty" Shuttleworth – drums
 Charlotte Banadout – backing vocals
 Grace Maxwell – backing vocals
 Kassie Landau – backing vocals
 Melissa Mantigi – backing vocals

 Monique Kyriacou – backing vocals
 Naomi Stoll – backing vocals
 Jeff Scantlebury – percussion
 Dick Cuthell – trumpet
 Edwyn Collins – production
 John Cornfield – mixing
 Mint Royale – remixing
 AP.D – artwork design
 Spencer Rowell – photography

Charts

Certifications

References

1998 songs
1999 singles
EMI Records singles
Mint Royale songs
Songs about alcohol
Terrorvision songs